"(And Now the Waltz) C'est La Vie" is a song by the British rock band Slade, released in 1982 as the lead single from the band's eleventh studio album The Amazing Kamikaze Syndrome. It was also included on its 1984 American counterpart Keep Your Hands Off My Power Supply. The song was written by lead vocalist Noddy Holder and bassist Jim Lea, and produced by Lea. It reached No. 50 in the UK, remaining in the charts for seven weeks.

Background
Slade started recording their second studio album for RCA in 1982, and in November that year, the album's first single, "(And Now the Waltz) C'est La Vie", was released. Attempting to appeal to the Christmas market, it reached No. 50 in the UK, but fared better in Poland, reaching No. 2 there in January 1983, while also reaching No. 29 on Radio Luxembourg's chart. As the song was not the big UK hit that both the band and RCA hoped for, the new album The Amazing Kamikaze Syndrome would not be released until December 1983. At the beginning of the year, RCA told the band that the album lacked potential chart hits and in the effort to amend that, the label hired producer John Punter to work on two new tracks "My Oh My" and "Run Runaway", both of which would go on to become big hits in 1983–84.

"(And Now the Waltz) C'est La Vie" was described by Holder as a "sentimental love song". In a 1983 interview with Sounds, Lea said of the song: "We thought it was a ballad but when Dave Lee Travis played it, he said "That's Slade and now for a ballad" and put Lionel Ritchie on and then we realised ours wasn't a ballad at all. It came over like four idiots trying to tear their way out of the speakers." Holder also told Sounds in 1983: "It looked as if it was going to be quite a big hit but unfortunately it didn't get much above #50 in the charts."

In 2005, Holder appeared on his regular TV-reviewing slot on the BBC Radio 2 show The Radcliffe and Maconie Show. Asked to choose a track from the band's new compilation album The Very Best of Slade, Holder chose "(And Now the Waltz) C'est La Vie". He felt the track, although not one of Slade's best-known singles, showed off his voice really well.

Release
"(And Now the Waltz) C'est La Vie" was released on 7" vinyl by RCA Records in the UK, Ireland, Australia, Germany and the Netherlands. The B-side, "Merry Xmas Everybody (Live & Kickin')", was exclusive to the single and would later appear on the band's 1985 studio/compilation album Crackers: The Christmas Party Album. On the single, it was credited to "Slade & The Assorted Nutters Choir".

Promotion
No music video was filmed to promote the single. In the UK, the band performed the song on the ITV children's music show Razzmatazz. In December, Slade embarked on a UK tour, which promoted the single and the newly released Slade on Stage album.

Critical reception
Upon release, Malcolm Dome of Kerrang! described the song as an "excellent taster" of the band's new studio album. In a review of The Amazing Kamikaze Syndrome, Kerrang! said the song "tends to disappear into the clouds of its own long-winded ambition." Sounds said: "The "Sailing"-style scarves in the air of "My Oh My" is surpassed by the even more anthemic "C'est La Vie"". In a retrospective review, Joe Geesin of the Get Ready to Rock! felt the song was a strange choice for a single.

Formats
7" Single
"(And Now the Waltz) C'est La Vie" - 3:44
"Merry Xmas Everybody (Live & Kickin')" - 4:03

Personnel
Slade
Noddy Holder - lead vocals, guitar
Jim Lea - piano, organ, bass, backing vocals, producer of "(And Now the Waltz) C'est La Vie"
Dave Hill - lead guitar, backing vocals
Don Powell - drums

Additional personnel
Slade - producer of "Merry Xmas Everybody (Live & Kickin')"

Charts

References

1982 singles
1982 songs
Slade songs
RCA Records singles
Songs written by Noddy Holder
Songs written by Jim Lea
Song recordings produced by Jim Lea